XJB-5-131 is a synthetic antioxidant. In a mouse model of Huntington's disease, it has been shown to reduce oxidative damage to mitochondrial DNA, and to maintain mitochondrial DNA copy number. XJB-5-131 also strongly protects against ferroptosis, a form of iron-dependent regulated cell death.

References 

Antioxidants
Synthetic biology
Huntington's disease